Kurti top is an upper garment worn in the Indian subcontinent encompassing waistcoats, jackets and blouses.

Kurti
In modern usage, a short kurta is referred to as the kurti, which is the attire of females. However, traditionally, the term kurti refers to waist coats, jackets and blouses which sit above the waist without side slits, and are believed to have descended from the tunic of the Shunga period (2nd century B.C.). The kurti is distinguished from the choli by the latter leaving the midriff exposed.

It is a typical dressing pattern of Indians especially the northern regions.

The trend and origin of this clothing style is from the northern India and even today the other parts of the nation though modernalized wear kurti but it is worn by females majorly in north while the south prefers saree.

There are a number of styles of kurti which include the following:

Punjabi kurti
In the Punjab region, the kurti is a short cotton waist coat which is buttoned down the front to the waist. In the past, women wore a chain of gold or silver called zanjiri around the buttons. Men wore the zanjiri on the kurta in the Punjab region.

Another style of Punjabi kurti is a short version of the anga (robe). The kurti can also be half or full sleeved and hip length with no front or back opening. Men's kurti is called phatui or wastkot in Punjabi. The kurti of South Punjab, Pakistan is referred to as the Saraiki kurti.

Based on the wish of the consumer the length of the kurti can be decided.

Bihari kurti
In Bihar, the term kurti is used to refer to a bodice which is a combination of the choli and jacket.

Uttar Pradesh
The kurti in Uttar Pradesh and the adjoining Himalayas region is a short blouse.

Gujarat
In Gujarat and Kathiawar, the type of kurti (coat) falls to just below the waist.

Rajasthan
The men's kurt in Rajasthan is a full sleeved, tightly fitting, buttonless vest.

Sindh

References

Indian clothing
Pakistani clothing
Tops (clothing)
Folk costumes